John Williams House, also known as the Williams Mansion House, is a historic home located near Williams Grove in Cumberland County, Pennsylvania. It was built between 1799 and 1802, and is a large -story, limestone building, five bays wide and two bays deep. It has a Georgian floorplan.  An extensive interior remodeling took place about 1825, and the house was restored in 1970.  A porch was added in the mid-19th century.

It was listed on the National Register of Historic Places in 1977.

References 

Houses on the National Register of Historic Places in Pennsylvania
Georgian architecture in Pennsylvania
Houses completed in 1802
Houses in Cumberland County, Pennsylvania
National Register of Historic Places in Cumberland County, Pennsylvania